Action Action Action (aka Action) is an album by American saxophonist Jackie McLean recorded in 1964 and released on the Blue Note label. It features McLean in a quintet with trumpeter Charles Tolliver, vibraphonist Bobby Hutcherson, bassist Cecil McBee and drummer Billy Higgins.

Reception
The Allmusic review by Scott Yanow awarded the album 4½ stars and stated: "This album is full of exciting music that has long been overshadowed."

Track listing
All compositions by Jackie McLean except where noted
 "Action" – 10:54
 "Plight" (Charles Tolliver) – 7:39
 "Wrong Handle" (Tolliver) – 7:35
 "I Hear a Rhapsody" (Jack Baker, George Fragos, Dick Gasparre) – 4:43
 "Hootnan" – 7:34

Personnel
Jackie McLean – alto saxophone
Charles Tolliver – trumpet
Bobby Hutcherson – vibes
Cecil McBee – bass
Billy Higgins – drums

References

Blue Note Records albums
Jackie McLean albums
1967 albums
Albums recorded at Van Gelder Studio
Albums produced by Alfred Lion